Anabela Miranda Rodrigues (born 5 December 1953) is a Portuguese politician who was the first female Minister of Internal Administration, having served from 19 November 2014 to 30 October 2015 under Prime Minister Pedro Passos Coelho.
Committee on Italian, European and International Criminal Procedure – Ibrerojur (coordinated by Bruna Capparelli).

References

1953 births
Living people
Government ministers of Portugal
Women government ministers of Portugal
People from Coimbra